The 1940 Texas A&M Aggies football team was an American football team that represented Texas A&M University in the Southwest Conference (SWC) during the 1940 college football season. In their seventh year under head coach Homer Norton, the Aggies compiled a 9–1 record (5–1 against SWC opponents), tied for the SWC championship, were ranked No. 6 in the final AP Poll, and defeated Fordham in the 1941 Cotton Bowl Classic. They played their home games at Kyle Field in College Station, Texas.

Schedule

References

Texas AandM
Texas A&M Aggies football seasons
Southwest Conference football champion seasons
Cotton Bowl Classic champion seasons
Texas AandM Aggies football